Massacre in Lace (French: Massacre en dentelles) is a 1952 French comedy crime film directed by André Hunebelle and starring Raymond Rouleau, Anne Vernon and Tilda Thamar. It was shot at the Saint-Maurice Studios in Paris. The film's sets were designed by the art director Lucien Carré. It is the third in the trilogy of films featuring the character of Georges Masse following Mission in Tangier (1949) and Beware of Blondes (1950).

Synopsis
A playboy reporter takes a break from his holiday to track down some gangsters.

Cast
 Raymond Rouleau as Georges Masse
 Anne Vernon as Thérésa Larsen
 Tilda Thamar as Clara Cassidi
 Bernard La Jarrige as P'tit Louis
 Maurice Teynac as Sophocle Zélos
 John Kitzmiller as Rocky Saddley
 Georges Chamarat as Alexandro Cassidi
 Monique Darbaud as Nora Cassidi
 Robert Vattier as Arsène de Loubiac
 Jacques Dynam as Pablo
 Monique Aïssata as Petite Lisette
 Louis Bugette as Carlos 
 Anne-Marie Duverney as La secrétaire de l'agence
 Lud Germain as Sam Barnett

References

External links
 

1952 films
1950s crime comedy films
1950s French-language films
Films directed by André Hunebelle
Films set in Venice
Films about journalists
Films with screenplays by Michel Audiard
1952 comedy films
French crime comedy films
French black-and-white films
Films shot at Saint-Maurice Studios
Pathé films
1950s French films